Thottuvelil Krishna Pillai Ayappan Nair (born in 1939) is a career civil servant who  formerly served as Adviser to the Prime Minister of India with the rank of the Minister of State. He also previously served as Principal Secretary to Prime Minister of India.

He is a 1963 batch Indian Administrative Service officer from Punjab Cadre. He also presently serves as Member of Board of Governors of Indian Institute of Management Kozhikode and Centre for Research in Rural and Industrial Development, Chandigarh. He formerly served as Chairman of Kerala State Industrial Development Corporation.

Early life and education
Nair was born in Ayroor, Kerala to Krishna Pillai and Bharathy Amma. He graduated with Bachelor of Arts (Honours) in History from the University College, Trivandrum.

Career
He later served as the Chief Secretary of Punjab. and Secretary to Government of India in the Ministry of Environment & Forest.  Later he served as Secretary in the Prime Minister’s Office during the terms of I.K.Gujral and Atal Bihari Vajpaayee.  Subsequently, he was Chairman of the Public Enterprises Selection Board which selects Chief Executives of India’s Public Sector Undertakings.  He served as Principal Secretary and later as Advisor to Prime Minister Dr. Manmohan Singh from 2004 to 2014.  Presently, he is the Managing Trustee of Citizens India Foundation – a charitable trust – and Executive Vice President of Kerala Blood Bank Society.

Awards and honours

See also

 The Accidental Prime Minister

References

External links
  
 The power of the small story
 TKA Nair appointed as OSD to Prime Minister before becoming Principal Secretary
 Sanskrit helps us identify our culture: Nair
 TKA Nair: Prime Minister's messenger of peace
 Civil Servants from Kerala hold key posts at Centre

1941 births
Living people
Nair, T. K. A.
Nair, T. K. A.
People from Pathanamthitta district
Manmohan Singh administration
Recipients of the Order of the Rising Sun, 2nd class